Mariola Teresa Abrahamczyk (née Fronckowiak, born 3 October 1958) is a Polish rower. She competed in the 1980 Summer Olympics.

References

External links
 
 
 

1958 births
Living people
Polish female rowers
Olympic rowers of Poland
Rowers at the 1980 Summer Olympics
Sportspeople from Poznań